Ben Clarke (born 15 April 1968), is a former England back-row international rugby union player.

Biography
Educated at Bishop's Stortford College, Clarke played for Bath Rugby from 1992 to 1996, before joining Richmond F.C. as the first £1-million player. He returned to Bath in 2000 for a second spell as captain, before knee injuries reduced his appearances and he left the club for a second time, joining Worcester Warriors as player/coach in 2001.

Clarke first played for England in November 1992 v South Africa.

In 1995 Clarke received the first yellow card in the sport, for stamping on the Irish player Simon Geoghegan, however, at the time the card was only shown as a warning and was not used to send players off. 

Clarke toured New Zealand in 1993 with the British and Irish Lions. He had an excellent tour and was voted player of the tour.

Clarke currently works as a money broker for BGC Partners. He worked there alongside Peter Winterbottom, until Winterbottom left in 2008.

See also
1993 British and Irish Lions tour to New Zealand

References

External links
Bio at Bath Rugby

1968 births
Living people
Bath Rugby players
British & Irish Lions rugby union players from England
England international rugby union players
English rugby union players
People educated at Bishop's Stortford College
Richmond F.C. players
Rugby union players from Bishop's Stortford
Worcester Warriors players